Brochiraja is a genus of deep-sea skates in the family Arhynchobatidae containing eight species. They are found in the waters around New Zealand and the Tasman Sea.

Species
 Brochiraja aenigma Last & McEachran, 2006 (Enigma skate)
 Brochiraja albilabiata Last & McEachran, 2006
 Brochiraja asperula (Garrick & Paul, 1974) (Smooth deep-sea skate)
 Brochiraja heuresa Last & Séret, 2012
 Brochiraja leviveneta Last & McEachran, 2006
 Brochiraja microspinifera Last & McEachran, 2006
 Brochiraja spinifera (Garrick & Paul, 1974) (Prickly deep-sea skate)
 Brochiraja vittacauda Last & Séret, 2012

References 
 

Rajiformes
Ray genera
Taxa named by Peter R. Last